The Garg may refer to:

The Gargoyle (newspaper), the student newspaper of University College, University of Toronto
Gargoyle Humor Magazine, a student magazine at the University of Michigan

See also
Garg (disambiguation)